Urophyllum ellipticum is a species of plant in the family Rubiaceae. It is endemic to Sri Lanka.

References

Flora of Sri Lanka
Urophyllum
Vulnerable plants
Taxonomy articles created by Polbot